The Eden Gardens is a cricket ground in Kolkata, India. It is one of the main international cricket venues of India and often called the "Mecca of Indian cricket". It is the home of the Bengal cricket team and the Kolkata Knight Riders, as well as being a Test, One Day International (ODI) and Twenty20 International (T20I) venue. As of 2020, the Eden Gardens has hosted more than 40 Test matches, the first of which was in January 1934 when India played the touring England team. These include the first ever day/night Test match in India which was hosted between 22 and 24 November 2019, when India played the visiting Bangladesh team. The first ODI played at the ground was between India and Pakistan on 18 February 1987. As of 2020, 30 ODIs have been played at the ground.

The first Test century scored at the ground was in December 1948, by Everton Weekes of the West Indies. He scored 162 runs in the first innings. In the same match Syed Mushtaq Ali of India scored 106 in the fourth innings, thus becoming the first Indian to have scored a century at the Eden Gardens. To date, 77 Test centuries have been scored at the ground. VVS Laxman's 281, scored against Australia in March 2001, during the famous second test of Border-Gavaskar Trophy, is the highest individual Test score achieved at the ground. The highest individual Test score by an overseas player is 256, scored by Rohan Kanhai of the West Indies in December 1958. Mohammad Azharuddin and VVS Laxman have scored five Test centuries each, the highest number of Test centuries scored by an individual player at the ground. During the second Test of the India–South Africa Test series held in February 2010 at the ground, a total of seven centuries were scored between the two teams. This is the highest number of centuries scored in a single Test match at the ground.

The first ODI century scored at the ground was by Kris Srikkanth of India on 18 February 1987. He scored 123 runs in the first innings against Pakistan. The first century scored by an overseas player was on 1 November 1989 by Desmond Haynes of the West Indies. He scored an unbeaten 107 runs against India. To date, 13 ODI centuries have been scored at the ground. Rohit Sharma's 264, scored against Sri Lanka on 13 November 2014, is the highest individual ODI score achieved at the ground as well as the highest individual score of all time in ODIs. The highest individual ODI score by an overseas player is 134 not out, scored by Graeme Smith of South Africa on 25 November 2005. No player has scored more than one ODI century at the ground. Two centuries were scored during the ICC World Cup in 2011. Ryan ten Doeschate of the Netherlands scored 106 runs and Paul Stirling of Ireland scored 101 runs in the first and second innings respectively of the same match on 18 March 2011.

The first T20I was played between India and the touring England team on 29 October 2011. As of 2020, seven T20I matches have been played at the ground. To date, no T20I centuries have been scored at the ground.

Karu Jain of India scored the only Women's One Day International (WODI) century achieved at the Eden Gardens. She scored 103 runs against England in the first innings on 9 December 2005. To date, no centuries have been scored in a Women's Test cricket match or a Women's Twenty20 International (WT20) match played in the stadium.

Keys

Test centuries
, seventy seven Test centuries have been scored at the ground.

One Day International centuries

, thirteen ODI centuries have been scored at the ground.

Women international centuries
, one Women's One Day International (WODI) century has been scored at the ground.

See also 

List of international cricket grounds in India
List of Test cricket grounds
List of One Day International cricket grounds
List of Twenty20 International cricket grounds
List of international cricket centuries at Brabourne Stadium

References

External links
Cricinfo Eden Gardens profile
NDTV Sports Eden Gardens profile
Cricbuzz Eden Gardens profile

Cricket grounds in India
Centuries
Eden Gardens